Yahya ibn Salama al-Kalbi was sent as governor of al-Andalus by the Caliph of Damascus Hisham ibn Abd al-Malik and his tenure in office lasted three years. 

Yahya denounced the injustices of the policies of Anbasa, especially with respect to the collection of taxes and the confiscation of property. On this account the new authoritarian governor prosecuted Arabs and Berbers charged with looting and illicit acquisition of goods from Christians, reverted the tax rates to the levels existing in 722 and undertook a restitution of illegally seized property. He was replaced in his position by the new governor of Ifriqiya, who in turn imposed in al-Andalus a new governor from his rival Arab tribe, the Qays.

Notes

See also
 Islamic conquest of Hispania

Umayyad governors of Al-Andalus
8th-century Arabs
Generals of the Umayyad Caliphate
Year of birth unknown
Arab generals
Banu Kalb